William McNamara (9 June 1876 – 21 November 1959) was an Australian rules footballer who played for Carlton in the Victorian Football League (VFL).

McNamara was a wingman at Carlton for six seasons and left the club after not being picked for the 1904 finals. As a result, he missed out on playing in the successful team which won three successive premierships from 1906 to 1908. During this time he was instead a VFL umpire and officiated in 104 games, mostly as a boundary umpire. He was on the boundary in the 1910 VFL Grand Final.

References

1876 births
Australian rules footballers from Victoria (Australia)
Carlton Football Club players
Brunswick Football Club players
Australian Football League umpires
1959 deaths